The 2022 Deutschland Tour is a men's road cycling stage race which took place from 24 to 28 August 2022. It is the 36th edition of the Deutschland Tour, which is rated as a 2.Pro event on the 2022 UCI Europe Tour and the 2022 UCI ProSeries calendars. This edition is the race's second in the UCI ProSeries.

Teams 
14 of the 19 UCI WorldTeams, two UCI ProTeams, three UCI Continental teams, and the German national team made up the twenty teams in the race.

UCI WorldTeams

 
 
 
 
 
 
 
 
 
 
 
 
 
 

UCI ProTeams

 
 

UCI Continental Teams

 
 
 

National Teams

 Germany

Schedule

Stages

Prologue 
24 August 2022 – Weimar,

Stage 1 
25 August 2022 – Weimar to Meiningen,

Stage 2 
26 August 2022 – Meiningen to Marburg,

Stage 3 
27 August 2022 – Freiburg to Schauinsland,

Stage 4 
28 August 2022 – Schiltach to Stuttgart,

Classification leadership table

Final classification standings

General classification

Points classification

Mountains classification

Young rider classification

Team classification

References

External links 
 

2022
Deutschland Tour
Deutschland Tour
Deutschland Tour
Deutschland Tour